Aquagenic urticaria, also known as water allergy and water urticaria, is a rare form of physical urticaria in which hives develop on the skin after contact with water, regardless of its temperature. The condition typically results from contact with water of any type, temperature or additive.

Signs and symptoms
The main symptom of aquagenic urticaria is the development of physical hives, which may or may not itch. Itching after contact with water, without the development of physical hives, is known as aquagenic pruritus. Aquadynia is a condition in which pain occurs after contact with water.

In severe cases, drinking water can result in swelling of the oral cavity, swelling of the throat, and in extreme cases, anaphylaxis.

The hives associated with aquagenic urticaria are typically small (approximately 1–3 mm), red- or skin-colored welts (called wheals) with clearly defined edges. It most commonly develops on the neck, upper trunk and arms, although it can occur anywhere on the body.  Once the water source is removed, the rash generally fades within 30 to 60 minutes.

Water in all forms, such as tap or sea water, swimming pool water, sweat, tears, and saliva can induce the lesions.

Cause
The cause of aquagenic urticaria is not fully understood; however, several mechanisms have been proposed. Interaction between water and a component in or on the skin or sebum has been suggested. This theory suggests that a substance is formed by this interaction, the absorption of which causes perifollicular mast cell degranulation with release of histamine. Another proposed theory is of a water-soluble allergen in the epithelial tissues. Water dissolves the allergen, causing it to diffuse into the tissues, causing histamine release from sensitized mast cells.

Diagnosis
Diagnosis of aquagenic urticaria begins with a clinical history and water challenge test. The water challenge test consists of application of a 35°C water compress to the upper body for 30 minutes. Water of any temperature can provoke aquagenic urticaria; however, keeping the compress at a similar temperature to that of the human body (37 °C) avoids confusion with cold urticaria or cholinergic urticaria. In addition, a forearm or hand can be immersed in water of varying temperatures to determine whether temperature is a factor in the patient's condition. Aquagenic urticaria differs from aquagenic pruritus, in which contact with water evokes intense itching without visible hives or rash.

Once known as a separate, rare disease, aquagenic urticaria is now considered a subtype of general urticaria. The first case was reported by Walter B Shelley et al. in 1964. The condition is more common in women than men, and typically presents for the first time during puberty. Genetics may play a part, and the condition may be related to other sensitivities such as lactose intolerance.

Prevention
Desensitization does not seem to work for aquagenic urticaria; a patient will continue to react to water no matter how gradually or frequently it is introduced. Topical application of antihistamines like 1% diphenhydramine before water exposure is reported to reduce the hives. Oil in water emulsion creams, or petrolatum, applied as barrier agents prior to a shower or bath may control symptoms. Therapeutic effectiveness of various classes of drugs differs from case to case.

Treatment
There is currently no treatment that will permanently cure the condition. Avoidance of water is recommended as a first line of defense, and most treatments are palliative in nature rather than curative:
 Oral or topical antihistamine
 Topical corticosteroids (specifically stanozolol)
 Phototherapy
 Barrier cream

See also 
 Aquagenic pruritus
 Aquadynia
 Cholinergic urticaria
 Solar urticaria
 List of cutaneous conditions

References 

Allergology
Rare diseases
Urticaria and angioedema